The Riverdale Jewish Center is an Orthodox synagogue in the Riverdale neighborhood of the Bronx, New York City.

The synagogue was founded by the Communal Services Division of Yeshiva University and has always identified itself as a bastion of that institution. Its rabbis included its founder Jacob Sable, Irving Greenberg, Yehezkel Hartmann, Joshua Shmidman, Abner Weiss and Jonathan Rosenblatt.
The Senior Rabbi is Rabbi Dovid Zirkind and the assistant rabbi is Rabbi Tzvi Benoff.
In the 2009 New York City bomb plot the New York City Police Department foiled a plot by American Muslims to bomb the synagogue. On May 30, 2009, New York Governor David Paterson announced he would give the Center and the Riverdale Reform Temple $25,000 each to improve their security.  The charter school Atmosphere Academy uses part of the building during the week for 8th grade classes.

Notable members
 Irving Greenberg
 Joseph Lieberman

External links
 RJC website

References

Synagogues in the Bronx
Modern Orthodox synagogues in the United States
Riverdale, Bronx
21st-century attacks on synagogues and Jewish communal organizations in the United States
Islamic terrorism in New York (state)
Orthodox synagogues in New York City